Planococcoides is a genus of true bugs belonging to the family Pseudococcidae.

Species:

Planococcoides anaboranae 
Planococcoides bengalensis 
Planococcoides celtis 
Planococcoides crassus 
Planococcoides formosus 
Planococcoides ireneus 
Planococcoides lamabokensis 
Planococcoides lindingeri 
Planococcoides lingnani 
Planococcoides macarangae 
Planococcoides mumensis 
Planococcoides njalensis 
Planococcoides pauliani 
Planococcoides robustus 
Planococcoides rotundatus

References

Pseudococcidae